The 2022 F1 Esports Series Pro Championship was an esports competition for Formula One which was the sixth season of the Formula One Esports Series. It was held in Formula One's official 2022 game. 

Lucas Blakeley won the driver's championship for the first time, as McLaren Shadow won the team's championship for the first time. Jarno Opmeer and Mercedes-AMG Petronas Esports Team were the defending champions, having won the Drivers' and Teams' titles respectively in 2021.

Format 

 Qualification - The season opens with online qualification, a global call for participation. Qualification is open to anyone with a copy of the official Formula 1 video game developed by Codemasters. The fastest gamers get through.
 Pro Exhibition - Qualifying gamers enter the Pro Draft where the official Formula 1 teams select their drivers to represent them in the F1 Esports Series Pro Championship.
 Pro Championship - The drivers race in a series of events that are broadcast live. Race distance was increased from 35% to 50% this year. Same as F1, drivers must make one pit stop if the weather is dry, and are not obligated to do so if it's wet. They earn points for themselves and their F1 teams. These races will determine the F1 Esports Series Pro Championship Teams’ and Drivers’ World Champions, with a portion of the prize fund distributed to the teams based on their standings.

Teams and drivers

Calendar

Season report

Event one

The season started off in Bahrain. Lucas Blakeley took pole position and led from the start, but had to fend off the likes of Frederik Rasmussen and rookie Thomas Ronhaar, which caused him to lose ground to the reigning champion, Jarno Opmeer. Opmeer attempted an overcut, while Ronhaar sustained damaged and retired from the race. Blakeley was given a penalty by the game, but it was revoked by the stewards and it allowed him to win ahead of Opmeer and his new teammate, Bari Boroumand.

At the next round in Imola, Ronhaar took his first pole position in the series. On the first lap, Opmeer was tagged from the back and fell to eighteenth. A poor strategy from Ronhaar relegated him to fourth place, with Blakeley winning back-to-back races. Marcel Kiefer was second for his only podium of the season, with his teammate Rasmussen getting his first podium of the season.

Rasmussen claimed his first pole of the season at Silverstone. Ronhaar settled for a long stint behind him, which eventually led to a last-lap battle between the two. Rasmussen took his first win of the season; Ronhaar took his first podium of the season (and also the first of his career). Blakeley got past Sebastian Job for third.

Event two

Rasmussen took another pole position at the Red Bull Ring. He and Ronhaar fought in wet conditions, but eventually, Ronhaar took the lead to win his first race in F1 Esports. Rasmussen ended up second, with Josh Idowu taking his first podium behind. Opmeer was fourth from Nicolas Longuet, Blakeley, and Boroumand.

Rasmussen again took pole at the Circuit de Spa-Francorchamps. He battled Boroumand throughout the race and fell back during the round of pit stops. Blakeley got pas Boroumand, but only briefly as he retook the position; Idowu managed to overtake Blakeley later. Rasmussen’s pace advantage over Boroumand resulted in a last-lap battle, but Boroumand took the win from Rasmussen, Idowu, and Blakeley.

Ronhaar took pole at Zandvoort, his home race. A rainy starting ground caused Piotr Stachulec, Ronhaar’s teammate, to spin into Dani Moreno, Opmeer’s teammate. By Lap 10, everyone but Opmeer was on medium tires, with Opmeer going for the hard compound. His plan failed as he dropped from second to four. Blakeley won his third race of the season from Boroumand, Rasmussen, and Opmeer, as pole-sitter Ronhaar ended up 9th.

Event three

Heading into the second half of the season, Blakeley had 110 points compared to Rasmussen’s 95. Boroumand was further back with 70 points, with Ronhaar and Opmeer on 63 and 60 points respectively.

Longuet took pole position in Monza, as Opmeer was only eighteenth. At the start, Longuet had a snap of understeer, allowing Boroumand to soar into the lead. Ronhaar got past Longuet as well to battle Boroumand for the win, which he achieved in another last-lap battle. Longuet ended up in third. Rasmussen was fifth with Blakeley seventh.

Rasmussen took another pole in Mexico City. After the round of pitstops, Rasmussen forced Ronhaar off the road at Turn 6; he eventually got a ten-second time penalty. Opmeer won for the first time since last year on the same track, with Boroumand and Ronhaar second and third respectively. Blakeley only managed 7th, and Rasmussen’s penalties sent him to twelfth at the end.

Ronhaar took his fourth pole position in Austin. After wet conditions at the start jumbled up the order, Boroumand entered the final lap in the lead from Ronhaar, Opmeer, and Brendon Leigh. At Turn 12, Ronhaar forced Boroumand to the outside, which allowed Opmeer and Leigh to join the battle. In the end, Opmeer won from Ronhaar, with Leigh taking his first podium in the series since 2020, and Boroumand was only fourth. Rasmussen was fifth and Blakeley ended up in sixth. Opmeer’s win put him only 21 points behind championship leader Blakeley, effectively making it a five-way championship fight between them, Boroumand, Ronhaar, and Rasmussen.

Grand final

Ronhaar took another pole at Suzuka, but Longuet shot up in the lead at Turn 1. When multiple people pitted, Jake Benham held up everyone for one lap so that his teammate, Opmeer, would benefit from the pitstops. This would eventually fail, as Opmeer crashed into Fabrizio Donoso, putting him out of the race. Longuet eventually won the race from Ronhaar. With Blakeley third and Boroumand fourth, McLaren Shadow won the team’s championship for the first time in Esports history.

Blakeley took pole at Interlagos, his first pole since the first round. Mixed conditions during the race led Rasmussen and Boroumand to fight for second position, with Rasmussen eventually getting the place only behind winner Blakeley. Ronhaar was only sixth and Opmeer was eighth. Boroumand and Opmeer’s poor results meant that they were officially eliminated from the championship fight.

Idowu took his second career pole position at the final round in Yas Island. On the first lap, Ronhaar shot into the lead and kept it for most of the race, but Rasmussen battled him in the latter stages. Rasmussen eventually won the race over Ronhaar, with Idowu behind in third. And with Lucas Blakeley fourth, he became the 2022 F1 Esports Champion, the first of his career and the fourth in the series.

Results

Season summary

Championship standings

Scoring system 

Points were awarded to the top 10 classified finishers in the race and one point was given to the driver who set the fastest lap inside the top ten. No extra points are awarded to the pole-sitter.

In the event of a tie at the conclusion of the championship, a count-back system is used as a tie-breaker, with a driver's/constructor's best result used to decide the standings.

Drivers' Championship standings

Teams' Championship standings  

 Notes: 
The standings are sorted by best result, rows are not related to the drivers. In case of tie on points, the best positions achieved determined the outcome.

References

External links 
 

Formula One Esports Series
Esports
2022 in esports